It's Only Love (German:Seine einzige Liebe) is a 1947 Austrian historical musical film directed by Emmerich Hanus and starring Franz Böheim, Klaramaria Skala and Walter Gynt. The film portrays the life of the composer Franz Schubert.

Cast
 Franz Böheim as Franz Schubert
 Klaramaria Skala as Therese Grob
 Walter Gynt as Vater Grob 
 Heinz Conrads as Schober
 Rudolf Kreitner as Schwind
 Julius Brandt as Diabelli
 Leopold Reiter as Vogl
 Teddy Kern 
 Charles Kalwoda
 Pepi Glöckner-Kramer 
 Jenny Liese as Mutter Grob 
 Martha Lukas as Kathi Fröhlich  
 Erika Meisels 
 Evi Servaes as Annerl  
 Helli Servi as Maria

References

External links 
 

1947 films
Austrian historical musical films
1940s historical musical films
1940s German-language films
Films set in the 19th century
Films set in Vienna
Films shot in Vienna
Films directed by Emmerich Hanus
Films about composers
Biographical films about musicians
Films about classical music and musicians
Cultural depictions of Franz Schubert
Austrian black-and-white films